Henry Franklin Harris (February 26, 1923 – February 1, 1999) was an American football guard in the National Football League for the Washington Redskins.  He played college football at the University of Texas and was drafted in the eighth round of the 1947 NFL Draft.

1923 births
1999 deaths
American football offensive guards
People from Camden, Alabama
Texas Longhorns football players
Washington Redskins players
Wilmington Clippers players